The 2022 Rakuten Japan Open Tennis Championships was a men's tennis tournament played on outdoor hard courts. It was the 47th edition of the Japan Open, and part of the ATP Tour 500 series of the 2022 ATP Tour. It was held at the Ariake Coliseum in Tokyo, Japan, from 3–9 October 2022. It was the first event since 2019, with the 2020 and 2021 events cancelled due to the COVID-19 pandemic. Third-seeded Taylor Fritz won the singles title.

Finals

Singles

  Taylor Fritz def.  Frances Tiafoe, 7–6(7–3), 7–6(7–2)

Doubles

  Mackenzie McDonald /  Marcelo Melo def.  Rafael Matos /  David Vega Hernández, 6–4, 3–6, [10–4]

Singles main-draw entrants

Seeds

 1 Rankings are as of September 26, 2022.

Other entrants
The following players received wildcards into the singles main draw:
  Kaichi Uchida
  Yasutaka Uchiyama
  Yosuke Watanuki

The following players received entry from the qualifying draw:
  Rio Noguchi
  Ramkumar Ramanathan 
  Sho Shimabukuro 
  Yuta Shimizu

The following player received entry as a lucky loser:
  Hiroki Moriya

Withdrawals
  Jenson Brooksby → replaced by  Tseng Chun-hsin
  Marcos Giron → replaced by  Kamil Majchrzak
  Cameron Norrie→ replaced by  Hiroki Moriya
  João Sousa → replaced by  Steve Johnson
  Alexander Zverev → replaced by  Alexei Popyrin

Doubles main-draw entrants

Seeds

 Rankings are as of September 26, 2022.

Other entrants
The following pairs received wildcards into the doubles main draw:
  Toshihide Matsui /  Kaito Uesugi 
  Yoshihito Nishioka /  Kaichi Uchida

The following pair received entry from the qualifying draw:
  Sander Gillé /  Joran Vliegen

Withdrawals
  Taro Daniel /  Marcos Giron → replaced by  Brandon Nakashima /  Hunter Reese
  Miomir Kecmanović /  João Sousa → replaced by  Hans Hach Verdugo /  Miomir Kecmanović
  Pedro Martínez /  Cameron Norrie → replaced by  Pedro Martínez /  Bernabé Zapata Miralles

References

External links 
 

 
Rakuten Japan Open
Rakuten Japan Open
Rakuten Japan Open